Yang Tao (born 15 September 1997) is a Chinese speed skater who competes internationally.
 
He participated at the 2018 Winter Olympics.

References

External links

1997 births
Living people
Chinese male speed skaters
Olympic speed skaters of China
Speed skaters at the 2018 Winter Olympics
Speed skaters at the 2022 Winter Olympics
21st-century Chinese people